The Brandenburg University of Technology Cottbus–Senftenberg (BTU) was founded in 1991 and is a technical university in Brandenburg, Germany with campuses in Cottbus and Senftenberg. The university has 185 professors, 640 additional academic staff and more than 7,000 students, of which 2,350 are of foreign origin from more than 100 nations.

History 
The university was a school for construction engineering in the former GDR starting in 1954. After German reunification, the school became a Technical University and was later renamed "Brandenburg Technical University" in 1994. In the following years, the university underwent major construction efforts and the number of students continued to grow. In February 2013 the Landtag of Brandenburg decided to merge the BTU and the Hochschule Lausitz on 1 July 2013 to found the new university Brandenburgische Technische Universität Cottbus-Senftenberg (abbreviated BTU). Today, the university has 7,280 students, 2,190 of whom come from abroad.

Structure 
The university is separated into six faculties (Fakultäten) each of them having a focus on certain study and research areas. Each faculty is further subdivided into institutes (Institute). The following faculties exist:
 Faculty 1: Mathematics, Computer Science, Physics, Electrical Engineering and Information Technology
 Faculty 2: Environment and Natural Sciences
 Faculty 3: Mechanical Engineering, Electrical and Energy Systems
 Faculty 4: Social Work, Health Care and Music
 Faculty 5: Business, Law and Social Sciences
 Faculty 6: Architecture, Civil Engineering and Urban Planning

Library 

The new library was opened in the year 2004 and is called Informations-, Kommunikations- und Medienzentrum (IKMZ). It was designed by the famous architects Herzog & de Meuron.

Study

Academic year 

Like for most universities in Germany, the academic year at BTU is divided into two semesters. The winter term (Wintersemester) is the official beginning of the academic year and lasts from 1 October to 31 March. The summer term (Sommersemester) lasts from 1 April to 30 September. The teaching takes place in only 15 weeks per semester and is followed by an examination period (Prüfungszeitraum) where usually no lectures are held.

Tuition and Fees 
All students, regardless if German or non-German, need to pay a fee of 321.03 Euro per semester. The fee includes a student transit pass (Semesterticket) which allows the students to travel with all public transportation services in the states Berlin and Brandenburg for free. Free use of regional express train (RE 18) to Dresden-Neustadt is also included. There is no further fee collected as the parliament of the federal-state Brandenburg decided not to introduce further study fees (Studiengebühr)

International Partnerships 
The BTU has a worldwide network of partner universities and allows students to take part in European Erasmus Programme or overseas programmes such as STUDEXA or
GE4. Students who want to participate in an exchange programme do not need to pay the tuition fee of the hosting university.

Student life 
The BTU has several facilities for the students comfortableness and facilitation, including but not limited to Cafeteria, restaurant, football yard, carrier center, etc.

Research 
The BTU is a research-oriented university with a focus on both basic and applied research. As a small technical university in Lusatia, the BTU faces up to its responsibility to act as an engine of innovation and internationalisation in the region and thus to exert a positive influence on the current structural change in Lusatia. The BTU is also active internationally with its research foci and transfers its local solution approaches to an international level.
The profile-formed research fields at BTU Cottbus-Senftenberg are:
 Global change und transformation processes
 Energy Reform and Decarbonization
 Health and Life Sciences
 Artificial Intelligence and Sensorics

Transfer of knowledge and technology 
The BTU sees itself with its research portfolio in regional technology and knowledge transfer. The "Central Technology Transfer" is carried out by the "Knowledge and Technology Transfer" department, which is attached to a vice-president. This department consists of the pillars Technology Transfer Office, Patents/Licences and the Career Centre and represents the original transfer area. The annual Transfer Day serves to present current results from the BTU. People from science and industry meet here to exchange ideas. The largest fair for academic specialists in the state of Brandenburg ("campus-x-change") takes place on the central campus of the BTU in Cottbus and aims to find internships, student trainee positions, final theses and graduate positions. A transfer database provides an overview of the BTU subject areas.

The BTU has developed a joint transfer strategy with the Technical University of Wildau. The declared aim of both universities is to actively promote networking with industry in the state of Brandenburg. In particular, the transfer project "Innovation Hub 13", which is funded by the BMBF for the years 2018 to 2022 as part of the "Innovative University" funding initiative, is a central component of these efforts. The project focuses on new transfer paths, but also on improved knowledge management via the joint platform "Innovation Hub 13".

The "Joint Lab Reliable Sensor Networks" is a joint facility of the Institute of Computer Science, the BTU Cottbus-Senftenberg as a whole and the Leibniz Institute for Innovative Microelectronics (IHP), in which researchers, students and doctoral candidates from the various institutions are to engage in a mutual exchange.

References

External links 
 

 
Buildings and structures in Cottbus
Educational institutions established in 1991
1991 establishments in Germany
Universities and colleges formed by merger in Germany
Universities and colleges in Brandenburg